Francis L. Fassitt was an American tennis player residing in France who finished runner-up to Jean Schopfer in the singles event of the Amateur French Championships in 1892.

Grand Slam finals

Singles: 1 (0-1)

References

19th-century American people
19th-century male tennis players
American expatriate sportspeople in France
American male tennis players
Year of birth missing
Year of death missing